Jean Chalon (born 8 March 1935) is a French journalist and writer. He first hesitated before a career as a Spanish teacher before deciding for journalism. He has spent most of his career at Le Figaro.

In love with nature, especially trees, and an admirer of famous women, Jean Chalon wrote and published the biographies of many female, holy or courtesan characters, writers or billionaires: Marie Antoinette, Louise de Vilmorin, Natalie Barney, Alexandra David-Néel, Colette, Liane de Pougy, Florence Gould, Thérèse de Lisieux ... but also of Lola Flores, a singer and flamenco dancer.

Chalon is a member of the jury of prix Alexandra-David-Néel/Lama-Yongden.

In 1994, Chalon was awarded the Prix Marcel Proust for Liane de Pougy, courtisane princesse et sainte.

Bibliography 

 Chère Marie-Antoinette
 Chère George Sand
 Chère Natalie Barney
 Le Lumineux Destin d’Alexandra David-Néel
 Journal d’un rêveur professionnel 2005-2007
 Liane de Pougy, courtisane, princesse et sainte, Flammarion, Prix Marcel Proust 1994
 Colette, L’éternelle apprentie
 Mémoires de Madame la Duchesse de Tourzel : Gouvernante des enfants de France de 1789 à 1795  avec la Duchesse de Tourzel, Carlos de Angulo
 Mémoires de Madame Campan, première femme de chambre de Marie-Antoinette, with Carlos de Angulo
 Florence et Louise les magnifiques : Florence Jay-Gould et Louise de Vilmorin
 La Lampe de sagesse avec Alexandra David-Néel
 Les Couples involontaires
 Thérèse de Lisieux, une vie d’amour
 La Guerre civile à 7 ans with Carlos de Angulo
 Mes quatre Déesses, with José Correa
 Le Diable ermite : Lettres à Jean Chalon 1968-1971 by François Augiéras and Jean Chalon
 Les chemins de Katmandou, followed by a dossier with inset photos on René Barjavel
 Les Bonheurs défendus
 L’Honneur de plaire
 Une jeune femme de 60 ans
 Journal d’un biographe, 1984-1997
 Collages de rêves
 Chère Lola Flores
 Journal d’un arbre, 1998-2001
 George Sand, une femme d’aujourd’hui
 L’avenir est à ceux qui s’aiment, ou, L’alphabet des sentiments
 Journal d’un lecteur : 2002-2004
 Zizou Artichaut Coquelicot Oiseau, illustrations by Alain Gauthier, Grasset Jeunesse, 1974

 Prefaces
 La double tragédie de Misia Sert, by Alexander Rzewuski
 Francis de Miomandre, un Goncourt oublié, by Remi Rousselot, 2013

 Postfaces
 Domme ou l’Essai d’occupation by François Augiéras

Distinctions 
He was made a chevalier of the Légion d'honneur on 14 July 2011.

References

External links 
 Jean Chalon on Babelio
 Jean Chalon on INA.fr (10 August 1979)
 Jean Chalon, un éternel jeune homme on Le Figaro (15 October 2007)
 J’ai vu Louise de Vilmorin devenir « Marilyn Malraux ». Par Jean Chalon on Paris Match (27 September 2010)

1935 births
20th-century French writers
20th-century French male writers
French biographers
20th-century French journalists
Chevaliers of the Légion d'honneur
Living people
French male non-fiction writers
Le Figaro people